John E. "Connie" Pleban was an ice hockey player and head coach who led Team USA to three medal finishes at international competitions.

Career
Pleban was a graduate of Eveleth High School in 1932 and continued his education at Eveleth Junior College. While there, Pleban was a member of the 1934 team that won an intercollegiate championship. After graduating, he became the player/coach for several teams and continued working in that capacity until 1942. After the United States entered World War II, Pleban entered the military and served until the end of the war.

In 1950, Pleban joined the US National Team as a player, coach and manager for the 1950 World Championships, and led the team to a silver medal. He retired as a player following the tournament but repeated the coaching feat two years later at the 1952 Winter Olympics. In 1955, Pleban was named head coach at Minnesota–Duluth and helped the program begin to transition to the top level of college hockey. He led the Bulldogs to the MIAC championship in each of his 4 years with the program, never losing a single conference game.

Pleban returned to Team USA in 1961 but couldn't get the defending Olympic gold medalists to find much success. Finishing with a 1–5–1 record, it was one of the program's poorest records, but Pleban was allowed to remain as coach and produced a far better result the following year. The US went 5–2 and ended up with the bronze medal. Afterwards, Pleban continued to work in the Duluth area, organizing amateur hockey throughout the 1960s and 70's.

He was inducted into the United States Hockey Hall of Fame in 1990 and was the recipient of the Hobey Baker Legends of College Hockey Award in 1992.

Head coaching record

International
Note: GC = Games coached, W = Wins, L = Losses, T = Ties, GF = Goals For, GA = Goals Against

College

References

External links
 

1914 births
2001 deaths
American ice hockey coaches
Minnesota Duluth Bulldogs men's ice hockey coaches
Ice hockey people from Minnesota
People from Eveleth, Minnesota
Ice hockey coaches from Minnesota
American military personnel of World War II
Military personnel from Minnesota